Edythe A. Baker (August 25, 1899 – August 15, 1971) was an American jazz pianist.

Baker was born in poverty in Girard, Kansas to Asa and Sophronia Baker. After her mother died around 1910 she was sent to Kansas City, Missouri  to live, and attended a convent. There she was trained in piano fundamentals, eventually working for a music store. After touring with a vaudeville troupe in 1918, Edythe moved to New York City in 1919. There she made piano rolls (for Aeolian and Duo-Art) between 1919 and 1926; these included ragtime and pop pieces. She worked on Broadway in musicals and performed with vaudeville troupes such as the Ziegfeld Follies.

In 1926, Baker relocated to England, and recorded twenty two pieces there between 1927 and 1933. She became a star there after appearing in revues in 1927. Constant Lambert saw her perform, and suggested to Harold Rutland that she might be the soloist for the premiere of his jazz-influenced choral piece The Rio Grande in 1930. However, Hamilton Harty was the eventual soloist.

She married into the banking family of Gerard d'Erlanger in 1928, and left the music industry after the mid 1930s. After divorcing d'Erlanger, she romanced the Duke of Kent. Baker returned to the United States in the late 1940s, at one point settling in Laguna, California and enjoying a quiet life of bridge and gardening. Little was heard of her until her death in Orange, California in 1971.

A selection of Baker's piano rolls, recorded by Dave Jasen, were reissued on an album released by Folkways Records in 1983.

Baker died in California in 1971, aged 71.

Confusion
Previously recorded dates of August 3, 1895 to November 22, 1965, were erroneously applied from another Edythe Baker who was born in Michigan and died in New York. This newer listing of 1899 to 1971 constitutes a correction discovered in September 1910. The August 1899 date was on three different passports and passenger lists, and the August 1971 date with a matching birth date was found in California death records.

References

External links
Article from the American Musical Instrument Collectors' Association, 1971
Biography Article and research by ragtime historian Bill Edwards, 2010.

1899 births
1971 deaths
Musicians from Missouri
Musicians from Kansas
People from Girard, Kansas
People from Kansas City, Missouri
20th-century American women pianists
20th-century American pianists
Ragtime composers
Ragtime pianists